Maria Aparecida Soares Ruas (born 1948) is a Brazilian mathematician specializing in differential geometry and singularity theory. She is a professor at the University of São Paulo.

Education and career
Ruas was born on 5 January 1948, in Lins, São Paulo. She became interested in mathematics through a junior high school mathematics teacher, Râmisa Jorge, and after entering university study in 1967, earned a licenciate in mathematics in 1970 through what is now the Faculty of Science and Letters of the Araraquara campus of São Paulo State University.

She became a teaching assistant at the same campus in 1971, while at the same time studying for a master's degree at the University of São Paulo, working there with Gilberto Francisco Loibel; she completed her degree in 1974, and was promoted to assistant professor. In 1982 she moved to the University of São Paulo as a professor. She defended her doctoral dissertation, Finity Determinacy and Applications at the University of São Paulo in 1983. It was jointly advised by Luiz Antonio Fávaro and Terence Gaffney.

She has headed the mathematics department at the University of São Paulo, was a founding member of the Brazilian Mathematical Society, and has organized the biennial Workshop on Real and Complex Singularities in Brazil. She is a coauthor of the book Differential Geometry from a Singularity Theory Viewpoint (World Scientific, 2016, with Shyuichi Izumiya, Maria del Carmen Romero Fuster, and Farid Tari).

Recognition
Ruas is a member of the Brazilian Academy of Sciences, elected in 2008, and in 2009 was named a commander in the National Order of Scientific Merit.

References

1948 births
Living people
Brazilian mathematicians
Brazilian women mathematicians
São Paulo State University alumni
University of São Paulo alumni
Academic staff of the University of São Paulo
Commanders of the National Order of Scientific Merit (Brazil)
People from Lins, São Paulo